The 2007-08 season in Danish football, starting July 2007 and ending June 2008.

Club results

Domestic honours

European participation
For the first time since the 2002-03 season, the Danish clubs had obtained enough UEFA coefficient points to qualify the third-place finisher of the Danish Superliga 2006-07 for the UEFA Cup. Prior to this, only the second-place finisher would qualify, alongside the Danish Cup winner and the occasional Intertoto qualifier.

National team

Players
The following players appeared for Denmark during the 2007-08 season. All caps and goals are tallied for the 2007-08 season only.

|-
! colspan="9"  style="background:#b0d3fb; text-align:left;"|

|-
! colspan="9"  style="background:#b0d3fb; text-align:left;"|

|-
! colspan="9"  style="background:#b0d3fb; text-align:left;"|

Friendly matches

The home team is on the left column; the away team is on the right column.

European Championship qualifiers
Denmark competed in the UEFA Euro 2008 qualifying Group F.

Notes

References

 
Danish football
Seasons in Danish football